Antiques Roadshow is a British television programme broadcast by the BBC in which antiques appraisers travel to various regions of the United Kingdom (and occasionally in other countries) to appraise antiques brought in by local people (generally speaking). It has been running since 1979, based on a 1977 documentary programme.

The series has spawned many international versions throughout Europe, North America and other countries with the same TV format. The program is hosted by Fiona Bruce and it is in its 45th series.

History 

The programme began as a BBC documentary that aired in 1977, about a London auction house doing a tour of the West Country in England. The pilot roadshow was recorded in Hereford on 17 May 1977 and presented by contributor Bruce Parker, a presenter of the news/current affairs programme Nationwide, and antiques expert Arthur Negus, who had previously worked on a similarly themed show, called Going for a Song. The pilot was so successful that it was transmitted and the format has remained almost unchanged ever since. Negus appeared on Antiques Roadshow until 1983. In the original BBC programme, various towns or famous places are advertised as venues. The show has since visited a number of other countries (including Canada in 2001 and Australia in 2005) and has been imitated by other TV production companies around the world.

In the United Kingdom, annual children's Christmas specials aired from 1991 until 2006, under the title Antiques Roadshow: The Next Generation (except for the 1991 edition, which was titled Antiques Roadshow Going Live) and used a specially reworked version of the regular theme music. However, there was no children's special in 2007; instead an edition was devoted to "antiques of the future" dating from the 1950s to the present day. Since then individually themed specials have been aired, though not every year.

A spin-off programme, 20th Century Roadshow, focusing on modern collectibles, aired between April and June 2005. It was hosted by Alan Titchmarsh. Two other spin-off programmes, Antiques Roadshow Gems (1991) and Priceless Antiques Roadshow (2009–10), revisited items from the show's history and provided background information on the making of the show and interviews with the programme's experts.

In the 1980s, a girl wrote in to Jim'll Fix It to ask if Jimmy Savile would "fix it" for her to "accidentally" drop and smash a seemingly valuable vase in an episode of the show. This was broadcast as part of a regular edition, as well as in the Jim'll Fix It episode, with many of the Roadshow spectators looking on in astonishment, until antiques expert David Battie, who retired in 2020, explained the ruse.

The most valuable item to ever appear on the show featured on 16 November 2008. This was an original 1990s maquette of the Angel of the North sculpture by Antony Gormley, owned by Gateshead Council, which was valued at £1,000,000 by Philip Mould. Glassware expert Andy McConnell later valued a collection of chandeliers at seven million pounds (their actual insurance value), noting as he did so that this beat Mould's record; however these were fixtures of the building in which the show was being filmed (Bath Assembly Rooms) rather than an item that had been brought in. In reality, the two most expensive objects to be sold as a result of being discovered on the show are the 1932 camera found by Marc Allum, which realised over $600,000 (US) in 2013 and the Christofle et Cie Japonisme jardiniere filmed by Eric Knowles, which sold for £668,450 (including buyers premium).

Conversely, many items brought before the experts are without commercial value, if not outright counterfeits. They are seldom shown in the broadcast episodes, to spare embarrassment for the individuals involved, although counterfeit objects are sometimes included, to give experts an opportunity to explain the difference between real and fake items. Value is not the only criterion for inclusion; items with an interesting story attached, or of a provenance relevant to the show's location, will often be featured regardless of value. An episode commemorating the end of the First World War and featuring personal mementoes, included no valuations. All items are appraised, although most appraisals take place off-camera, with only the most promising items (around 50 on an average day) being filmed, of which about 20 appear in the final programme.

Some significant items have been acquired by museums after being sold once their owners were appraised of their true value. An example is the watercolour painting The Artist's Halt in the Desert by Richard Dadd, discovered and shown by Peter Nahum in 1986 and purchased the next year by the British Museum for £100,000. Another such item, later dubbed "Ozzy the Owl", is a Staffordshire slipware jug, valued by Henry Sandon on a 1990 show at £20,000 to £30,000, and subsequently acquired by Potteries Museum & Art Gallery.

The original theme music was Bach's Brandenburg Concerto No. 3 (for several years in a Moog synthesiser version by Wendy Carlos), but was changed in the early 1990s to an original piece. This theme was written by Paul Reade and Tim Gibson and published by Air Edel.

Format

Visitors (predominantly from the area being visited by the show) bring along their possessions to be evaluated for authenticity and interest (especially related to the venue) and an approximate valuation is given. The production team selects the items whose appraisal is to be televised. Often, the professional evaluators give a rather in-depth historical, craft, or artistic context to the item, adding a very strong cultural element to the show. This increases the show's appeal to people interested in the study of the past or some particular crafts, or certain arts, regardless of the monetary value of the objects. At the core, however, the focus of the production is on the interplay between the owner and the evaluator.

Presenters
Antiques Roadshow has been hosted by:

 Bruce Parker (1979)
 Angela Rippon (1979)
 Arthur Negus (1979–1983)
 Hugh Scully (1981–2000)
 Michael Aspel (2000–2007)
 Fiona Bruce (2008–)

Programme experts for 2021/2022

Antiques Roadshow has a team of experts numbering over 60. Many have areas of speciality, some of them are long tenuring experts on the programme.

Arms and militaria

 Bill Harriman
 Runjeet Singh
 Mark Smith
 Robert Tilney

Books and manuscripts

 Justin Croft
 Clive Farahar
 Matthew Haley
 Rupert Powell
 Fuchsia Voremberg

Ceramics and glass

 Alexandra Aguilar
 Serhat Ahmet
 Rosa Assennato
 John Axford
 David Battie (he retired in 2021, after 43 years on the show)
 Theo Burrell
 Will Farmer
 Andy McConnell
 Steven Moore
 Henry Sandon
 John Sandon
 Lars Tharp

Clocks and watches

 Alastair Chandler
 Richard Price
 Ben Wright

Furniture

 Lennox Cato
 Christopher Payne
 John Bly

Jewellery

 John Benjamin
 Kate Flitcroft
 Joanna Hardy
 Geoffrey Munn
 Susan Rumfitt
 Siobhan Tyrrell

Miscellaneous

 Marc Allum
 George Archdale
 Ronnie Archer-Morgan
 Paul Atterbury
 Jon Baddeley
 Cristian Beadman
 Elaine Binning
 Bunny Campione
 Wayne Colquhoun
 John Foster
 Fergus Gambon
 Sally Hoban
 Mark Hill
 Amin Jaffer
 Hilary Kay
 Eric Knowles
 Lisa Lloyd
 Judith Miller
 Adam Schoon
 Philip Taubenheim
 Jennifer Welch
 Chris Yeo
 Lee Young

Pictures and prints

 Frances Christie
 Dendy Easton
 Grant Ford
 Alexandra Gill
 Lawrence Hendra
 Rupert Maas
 Philip Mould
 Charlotte Riordan
 Suzanne Zack

Silver

 Duncan Campbell
 Alastair Dickenson
 Gordon Foster
 Ian Pickford

Locations

Episodes 

Episodes are usually filmed during the spring and summer and aired the following autumn and winter (into the following year). Each location visited is covered by one or two (exceptionally even three) episodes.

International versions

Australia
In 2005, part of the BBC team visited Australia and produced six one-hour episodes in conjunction with The LifeStyle Channel (XYZnetworks). These were titled Antiques Roadshow Australia. A special was also made about the visit to Australia, entitled Antiques Roadshow Australia: Behind the Scenes.

Belgium
In Flanders, VTM has been broadcasting a local version, called Rijker dan je denkt? (Richer than you thought?) since 2012, which is hosted by Staf Coppens.

Canada

In Canada, Canadian Antiques Roadshow – a programme based on the British and American versions - debuted in January 2005 on CBC Television and CBC Newsworld. The show has also been aired on CBC Country Canada. It was hosted by Valerie Pringle.

The most expensive item featured was Henry Nelson O'Neil's "Eastward Ho!" oil on canvas. Recommended insurance: CDN$500,000, later sold at Sotheby's in London for £164,800 (about CDN$300,000 at the 2008 exchange rate).

Finland
The Finnish version, known as Antiikkia, antiikkia, (Antiques, antiques), has been running on YLE TV1 since 1997.

Germany
In Germany, various versions are broadcast regularly on the public regional channels of the ARD, the oldest being the BR production Kunst und Krempel (Art and Junk), airing since 1985. Other versions include Lieb & teuer (Near & dear), shown on NDR, Kitsch oder Kunst? (Kitsch or Art?), shown on HR, and Echt Antik?! (Genuinely antique?!), shown on SWR.

Netherlands
The show Tussen Kunst & Kitsch (Between Art & Kitsch) has been running in the Netherlands since 1984. First shown on AVRO, the programme is usually set in a museum somewhere in the Netherlands, sometimes in Belgium and Germany. Due to its popularity, special episodes have been made in which the experts take the viewers on "cultural art excursions" to places of great importance in the history of art.

In 2011, a painting of Joost van Geel with the title Het Kantwerkstertje (The Little Lacemaker) was discovered with an estimated value of 250,000 euros, the highest-appraised item on the show. The programme has been presented by Cees van Drongelen (1984-2002), Nelleke van der Krogt (2002-2015), and Frits Sissing (2015-), and it celebrated its 30th series in 2014.

Sweden

The Swedish version started out as a co-production between SVT Malmö and the BBC, whose Antiques Roadshow visited Scandinavia for two programmes. Antikrundan (Antiques Round), its Swedish version, premiered in August 1989 on TV2, and SVT has produced a new season every year since.

As of 2019, 30 seasons have been shown and most of the experts have been with the programme since its start. Jesper Aspegren was the original host. He left in 2000, and from the 2001 season onwards, Antikrundan has been hosted by Anne Lundberg.

The BBC original is also run on Swedish television, under the name Engelska Antikrundan ("English  Antiques Round").

United States

American public broadcaster PBS created a show in 1997 inspired by the Antiques Roadshow. The American version of Antiques Roadshow is produced by WGBH, a PBS member station in Boston, Massachusetts. Mark Walberg is host and Marsha Bemko is executive producer.

PBS also airs the original BBC programme, though it is called Antiques Roadshow UK to differentiate it from the PBS version. Values of items in United States dollars are often superimposed over the pound sterling values given in the original broadcast.

Related shows

Specials

Overseas specials
Hugh Scully hosted a Beaulieu based show on 3 January 1993, a Jamaican based show on 14 February 1993, a Cork based show on 13 February 1994 and a Brussels based show on 16 April 1995, all on the BBC.

Antiques Roadshow Detectives
Fiona Bruce together with individual Antiques Roadshow appraisers investigate the history of significant items, uncovering the stories that form the history of family heirlooms and finding out about their origin and authenticity.

Broadcasts
This one-season programme was broadcast in 2015 and comprises 15 episodes.

In Sweden it was shown on SVT in Autumn 2018 under the name of Engelska Antikrundan: Arvegodsens hemligheter ("English Round of Antiques: The Secrets of the Heirlooms").

Reception
Ellen E Jones of The Independent called the first episode, about a Cromwellian escutcheon, "a welcome addition to the schedules".

Literature

Magazines
The BBC published a monthly Homes & Antiques magazine until 2011, which offered behind-the-scenes insights into Antiques Roadshow, as well as offering tips and advice on buying and evaluating antiques. This magazine still exists, now published by Immediate since 2015.

There is also a spin-off magazine of the American version of the show called Antiques Roadshow Insider, which gives fans an inside look at the show as well as offering special features about antiques and collectibles from the programme itself.

Further reading
 
 
 Antiques Roadshow: Experts on Objects. Edited by Christopher Lewis. Authors include Eric Knowles, David Battie, John Bly and Anthony J Lester. BBC Books, 1987. p. 192. .

See also 
 Bargain Hunt (2000–)
 Cash in the Attic (2002–2012)
 Flog It! (2002–2020)
 Dickinson's Real Deal (2006–)
 Antiques Road Trip (2010–)
 Fake or Fortune? (2011–)

References

External links
 
 
 

 
1970s British television series
1979 British television series debuts
1980s British television series
1990s British television series
2000s British television series
2010s British television series
2020s British television series
Antiques television series
BBC high definition shows
BBC Television shows
Television series by BBC Studios
British reality television series
English-language television shows
Television series produced at Pinewood Studios